The Yoshimoto New Star Creation, commonly called NSC or Yoshimoto Academy, is the comedy school established by Yoshimoto Kogyo in Japan.

History
There are currently two campuses, the original NSC, established in 1982 in Osaka and the Tokyo branch NSC established in 1995. Students enroll for the purpose of becoming a comedian and the school is meant to be a systematic entry into the entertainment industry as a Yoshimoto Kogyo affiliated comedian after graduation.

Officially established as Yoshimoto General Comedy Arts Academy (吉本総合芸能学院), both the Osaka and Tokyo branches have produced numerous successful comedians and television personalities.

In order to enroll, the applicant must have graduated middle school. Each graduation class is considered as a generation, for example, the comedy duo Downtown were one of the first graduates of the school as the 1st generation at NSC Osaka in 1982

Students of the academy go through various comedy classes focused on manzai, conte and other modern owarai comedy genres. The school often brings in established comedians as speakers and temporary teachers to further the students' development.

Notable alumni

NSC Osaka

NSC Tokyo

NSC Nagoya (1993-2005, 2019-)

References

External links
 Official website

Japanese comedy
1982 establishments in Japan
Educational institutions established in 1982